Antonka is a rural locality (a village) in Krasnoplamenskoye Rural Settlement, Alexandrovsky District, Vladimir Oblast, Russia. The population was 18 as of 2010. There is 1 street.

Geography 
Antonka is located 56 km northwest of Alexandrov (the district's administrative centre) by road. Leninskaya Sloboda is the nearest rural locality.

References 

Rural localities in Alexandrovsky District, Vladimir Oblast
Pereslavsky Uyezd